Brentino Belluno is a comune (municipality) in the Province of Verona in the Italian region Veneto, located about  west of Venice and about  northwest of Verona.

The municipality of Brentino Belluno contains the frazioni (subdivisions, mainly villages and hamlets) Belluno Veronese, Rivalta, Brentino, and Preabocco.

Brentino Belluno borders the following municipalities: Avio, Caprino Veronese, Dolcè, Ferrara di Monte Baldo, and Rivoli Veronese.

References

External links
 Official website

Cities and towns in Veneto